Dezna is a commune in Arad County, Romania. Located in the valley of the river Dezna about 7 km from Sebiș, it is composed of five villages: Buhani (Bajnokfalva), Dezna, Laz (Déznaláz), Neagra (Kisfeketefalu) and Slatina de Criș (Mikószlatina).

Population
According to the 2002, the population of the commune was 1523 inhabitants, out of which 98.2% are Romanians, 0.6% Hungarians, 0.7% Roma and 0.5% are of other or undeclared nationalities.

History
The first documentary record of Dezna dates back to 1318. Buhani was attested documentarily in 1441, Laz between 1553- 1561, while Neagra and Slatina de Criș in 1553.

Economy
The economy of the commune is mainly agricultural, farming, livestock-breeding and conversion of timber are well represented.

References

Communes in Arad County
Localities in Crișana